The Laidlaw Memorial School of St. George's Homes, Ketti is an English-medium school in Ketti, Tamil Nadu, India.This school also appeared in the Tamil film, Panneer Pushpangal.

See also

 St. Joseph's Higher Secondary School, Ooty
 St. Joseph's Boys School, Coonoor
 Breeks Memorial School, Ooty
 Hebron School, Ooty
 Lawrence School, Lovedale, Ooty
 Woodside School, Ooty
 Stanes Hr.Sec. School, Coonoor
 Good Shepherd International School, Ooty
 Mountain Home High School, Coonoor

External links
  Official website
 Old Georgian Association
 

Christian schools in Tamil Nadu
Boarding schools in Tamil Nadu
High schools and secondary schools in Tamil Nadu
Schools in Nilgiris district
Educational institutions established in 1914
1914 establishments in India